BMP and activin membrane-bound inhibitor homolog (Xenopus laevis), also known as BAMBI, is a protein which in humans is encoded by the BAMBI gene.

Function 

This gene encodes a transmembrane glycoprotein related to the type I receptors of the transforming growth factor-beta (TGF beta) family, whose members play important roles in signal transduction in many developmental and pathological processes. The encoded protein however is a pseudoreceptor, lacking an intracellular serine/threonine kinase domain required for signaling. Similar proteins in frog, mouse and zebrafish function as negative regulators of TGF-beta, which has led to the suggestion that the encoded protein may function to limit the signaling range of the TGF-beta family during early embryogenesis.

References

Further reading

External links